Barbro Karin Viola Westerlund Larsson (born 29October 1956), better known as Babben, is a Swedish actress and comedian.

Life and career 
Babben was born in Dalhem on Gotland and is recognised by her pronounced Gotlandic dialect. Now living in Solna with her daughter, she attended the National Academy of Dramatic Art in Stockholm in 1977–1980. She has been active in the S.U.C.K. (Stand Up Comedy Club) since 1988 and comedian group R.E.A. (Roligt Elakt Aktuellt). She has also appeared in the TV show Parlamentet and had her own talk show Babben & co in 2007. She performed as a stand up comedian in Great Britain 1996 and also did a couple appearances on British television.

In 2006, she was voted the most popular female comedian in Sweden in the popular TV-programme Folktoppen.

In 1992, Swedish astronomer Claes-Ingvar Lagerkvist named one of the asteroids in the asteroid belt, 10795 Babben after her.

Selected filmography 
Appearances in films and television series.
1980 – Children's Island
1984 – Tryggare kan ingen vara … (TV series)
1989 – Peter och Petra
1994 – Läckan
1994 – 13-årsdagen
1996 – Drömprinsen – filmen om Em
1996 – Polisen och pyromanen (TV series)
1997 – Nattbuss 807
1998 – Lithivm
1999 – Sherdil
2007 – Leende guldbruna ögon (TV series)
2010 – Fyra år till
2013 – Wallander – försvunnen
2014 – LasseMajas detektivbyrå – Skuggor över Valleby2020 – Mirakel''

References

External links 

1956 births
Living people
Swedish actresses
Swedish comedians
Swedish women comedians
Sommar (radio program) hosts
Swedish women radio presenters
People from Gotland